Éntekhno (pl: éntekhna [tragoudia]) is orchestral music with elements from Greek folk rhythm and melody. Its lyrical themes are often based on the work of famous Greek poets. Éntekhno arose in the late 1950s, drawing on rebetiko's westernization by Vassilis Tsitsanis and Manolis Chiotis. Mikis Theodorakis and Manos Hatzidakis were the most popular early composers of éntekhno song cycles.

Origins

As opposed to other forms of Greek urban folk music, éntekhno concerts would often take place outside a hall or a night club in the open air. Mikis Theodorakis and Manos Hadjidakis were the most popular early composers of éntekhno art-popular songs. They were both educated in Classical music and -among other reasons- the lacking of a wide public for this kind of music in Greece, drove them to the invention of Éntekhno, in which they transferred some values of Western art music.  Other significant Greek songwriters included Stavros Kouyoumtzis, Manos Loïzos, and Dimos Moutsis. Significant lyricists of this genre are Nikos Gatsos, Manos Eleftheriou and poet Tasos Livaditis. By the 1960s, innovative albums helped éntekhno become close to mainstream, and also led to its appropriation by the film industry for use in soundtracks.

Works
Notable éntekhno works include:

Six folk paintings (Manos Hatzidakis, 1951)
Epitaphios (Mikis Theodorakis, 1960, poetry by Yiannis Ritsos)
Epifania (Mikis Theodorakis, 1962, poetry by Giorgos Seferis)
Dead brother's song (Mikis Theodorakis, 1962)
Mikres Kyklades (Mikis Theodorakis, 1963, poetry by Odysseas Elytis)
"To Axion Esti" (Mikis Theodorakis, 1964, poetry by Odysseas Elytis)
Gioconda's Smile (Manos Hatzidakis, 1965)
Romiossini (Mikis Theodorakis, 1966, poetry by Yiannis Ritsos)
Ballos (Dionysis Savvopoulos, 1970)
O Megalos Erotikos (Manos Hatzidakis, 1972)
Eighteen Short Songs of the Bitter Motherland (Mikis Theodorakis, 1973, poetry by Yiannis Ritsos)
Our Great Circus (Stavros Xarchakos for the theatrical play of Iakovos Kambanellis, 1974)
Tetralogia (Dimos Moutsis, 1975, poetry by Constantine P. Cavafy, Kostas Karyotakis, Yiannis Ritsos and Giorgos Seferis)
Stavros tou Notou (Southern Cross) (Thanos Mikroutsikos, 1979, poetry by Nikos Kavvadias)

Artists

Composers:
Manos Hatzidakis
Manos Loïzos
Yannis Markopoulos
Thanos Mikroutsikos
Dimos Moutsis
Mimis Plessas
Mikis Theodorakis
Stavros Xarchakos
Nikos Gatsos (lyricist)
Manos Eleftheriou (lyricist)

Singers:
Haris Alexiou
Giorgos Dalaras
Nikos Xilouris
Maria Dimitriadi
Maria Farantouri
Manolis Mitsias
Nana Mouskouri
Nena Venetsanou 
Grigoris Bithikotsis

New Wave

A form of éntekhno which is even closer to western classical music was introduced during the mid-1960s, which was called New Wave and was a mixture of éntekhno and chansons from France. One of the first contributors to the genre was Dionysis Savvopoulos, who mixed American musicians like Bob Dylan and Frank Zappa with Macedonian folk music and politically incisive lyrics. In his wake came more folk-influenced performers like Arleta, Mariza Koch, Mihalis Violaris, Kostas Hatzis and the composer Giannis Spanos. This music scene flourished in a specific type of boîte de nuit.

Artists
 
Arleta
Keti Chomata
Kostas Hatzis
Mariza Koch
Rena Koumioti
Yiannis Parios
Giannis Poulopoulos
Dionysis Savvopoulos
Giannis Spanos
Mihalis Violaris
Giorgos Zographos

Contemporary éntekhno
Contemporary éntekhno is the form of éntekhno that emerged in the 1980s and is mostly what éntekhno means when used in context today.

Artists

Eleftheria Arvanitaki (contemporary laïkó)
Haris Alexiou (laïkó-éntekhno)
Alkinoos Ioannidis (Cypriot singer)
Katsimihas Brothers
Stamatis Kraounakis (laïkó and éntekhno composer and performer)
Lavrentis Mahairitsas
Savina Yannatou

Miltos Paschalidis
Sokratis Malamas
Thanassis Papakonstantinou
Nikos Papazoglou
Alkistis Protopsalti (contemporary laïkó, éntekhno pop)
Tania Tsanaklidou
Nikos Xydakis (composer and musician only)
Giannis Haroulis

See also
Laïkó
Rebetiko
Greek folk music
Nana Mouskouri

References

Greek music